Gavin J. Grant is a science fiction editor and writer. He runs Small Beer Press along with his wife Kelly Link. In addition, he has been the editor of Lady Churchill's Rosebud Wristlet since 1996 and, from 2003 to 2008, was co-editor of the Year's Best Fantasy and Horror anthology series along with Link and Ellen Datlow. Their 2004 anthology was awarded the Bram Stoker Award for best horror anthology.

He moved to the United States from Scotland in 1991. He is married to Kelly Link and lives with her in Northampton, Massachusetts.

References

External links

Gavin J. Grant's online fiction at Free Speculative Fiction Online
How to Start a Small Press an article by Grant at Strange Horizons

Print editors
American book publishers (people)
Scottish publishers (people)
Scottish fantasy writers
Writers from Northampton, Massachusetts
Living people
Year of birth missing (living people)
Male speculative fiction editors